Dol may refer to:

Places
 Dol-de-Bretagne, a commune in the Ille-et-Vilaine département, France
 Mont-Dol, a commune in the Ille-et-Vilaine département, France 
 Dol pri Borovnici, a village in Borovnica municipality, Slovenia
 Dol pri Hrastniku, a village in Hrastnik municipality, Slovenia
 Dol pri Hrastovljah, a village in the municipality of Koper, Slovenia
 Dol pri Laškem, a village in Laško municipality, Slovenia
 Dol pri Ljubljani, a municipality near Ljubljana, Slovenia
 Dol pri Stopercah, a village in Majšperk municipality, Slovenia
 Dol pri Vogljah, a village in Sežana municipality, Slovenia
 Dol, Stari Grad, a village on the Croatian island of Hvar
 Dol, Brač, a village near Postira on the Croatian island of Brač
 Mali Dol, a village near Kraljevica, Croatia
 Dugi Dol, a village near Krnjak, Croatia
 Dol, Krašić, a village near Krašić, Croatia
 Dol, Visoko, a village near Visoko, Bosnia and Herzegovina
 Dół, Poland

Other
 Dol (film), a 2007 Kurdish film
 A little-used unit of measurement for pain; see pain scale
 Dolorimeter, pain measuring instrument
 Department of Labor
 Washington Department of Licensing, a group that issues various licenses in the US state of Washington
 Direct on line starter, a type of start associated with electric motors
 Doljanchi, a traditional Korean ceremony for celebrating a baby's first birthday 
 Dol Purnima or Dolyatra, the Bengali variant of the Holi festival
 Dol or Dool, another slang for cannabis (mostly marijuana)
 Deprivation of liberty, one of the definitions of abuse within UK law
 An alternative transliteration of Dhol, an Indian drum

See also

DOL (disambiguation), as an acronym
dole (disambiguation)